Ambohidratrimo is a town in Analamanga Region, in the  Central Highlands of Madagascar, located at 15 km from the capital of Antananarivo.

There are found the  Twelve sacred hills of Imerina.

References

External links
 

Populated places in Analamanga